Gaultheria cuneata is a species of flowering plant in the family Ericaceae, native to western China. Like others of its family, it is a calcifuge, preferring an acid peaty soil. In cultivation it is used as groundcover for underplanting larger shrubs.

References

cuneata